Xiao Xiaolin (August 1956 or 1962 – June 28, 2017) was a TV host and anchorwoman in mainland China and a native of Changsha, Hunan.

Biography 
After graduating from the Beijing Broadcasting Institute (now the Communication University of China) in 1981, she went to Changsha TV Station (now Hunan Media Group).

In 1988, she was officially transferred to China Central Television as the anchor. During the period, she hosted the "Xinwen Lianbo", "Focus Report", "Legal Report" and so on.

She were officially retired until February 2017.

On June 28, 2017 (speculative date), she died of rectal cancer in Logan, Utah, USA.

References 

20th-century births
2017 deaths
Year of birth uncertain
Communication University of China alumni
Chinese television presenters